Tommy de Jong (born 6 February 1987) is a French-Dutch professional footballer who plays as a midfielder for ASPV Strasbourg.

Early life
His family migrated in the 1980s from Valburg, Gelderland, Netherlands, to the French city of Strasbourg. De Jong was born there and holds a Dutch passport.

Career
De Jong played at professional level in Eerste Divisie for FC Dordrecht.

References

1987 births
Living people
Footballers from Strasbourg
Association football midfielders
French footballers
French people of Dutch descent
Dutch people of French descent
FC Martigues players
FC Dordrecht players
RC Strasbourg Alsace players
ASPV Strasbourg players
SC Schiltigheim players
Championnat National players
Championnat National 2 players
Championnat National 3 players
Eerste Divisie players